AMOS-3, also known as AMOS-60, is an Israeli communications satellite operated by Spacecom Satellite Communications.

History  
Spacecom Satellite Communications has signed an agreement in September 2005 with Israel Aerospace Industries (IAI) to buy its third satellite, AMOS-3, from the Israeli defense contractor.

Satellite description 
The satellite is powered by twin solar panels, and is based on the Israeli AMOS Bus. It replaced AMOS-1 in geosynchronous orbit at 4° West. AMOS-3 carries fourteen Ku-band / Ka-band transponders, and is expected to have an on-orbit lifetime of 18 years.

Launch 
It was launched atop the maiden flight of the Zenit-3SLB launch vehicle, the first launch contracted by the Land Launch organisation. The launch was originally scheduled to occur in 2007, and later March 2008, however this was delayed until 24 April 2008. The launch attempt on 24 April 2008 was scrubbed for "technical reasons". This was later determined to be a problem with the erector/transporter system, which had failed to retract and move away from the launch vehicle. AMOS-3 lifted-off from Site 45/1 at the Baikonur Cosmodrome at 05:00:00 UTC on 28 April 2008.

AMOS-60 
The satellite was renamed AMOS-60 to commemorate the 60th anniversary of the state of Israel in 2018.

See also 

 Amos-2

References

External links 
 International Media Switzerland  Official provider's site

Communications satellites of Israel
Satellites using the AMOS bus
Communications satellites in geostationary orbit
Spacecraft launched in 2008
Spacecraft launched by Zenit and Energia rockets
2008 in Israel